William James Hollahan (November 22, 1896 – November 27, 1965) was a third baseman in Major League Baseball. He played for the Washington Senators.

References

External links

1896 births
1965 deaths
Major League Baseball third basemen
Washington Senators (1901–1960) players
Baseball players from New York City
Burials at Gate of Heaven Cemetery (Hawthorne, New York)
Houston Buffaloes players
Minneapolis Millers (baseball) players
Omaha Buffaloes players
Rochester Hustlers players
Shreveport Gassers players
St. Joseph Saints players
Wichita Larks players